Epiphryne charidema is a moth in the family Geometridae. It is endemic to New Zealand. This species was first described by Edward Meyrick in 1909. This species has two subspecies, Epiphryne charidema charidema and Epiphryne charidema autocharis.

References 

Geometridae
Moths of New Zealand
Endemic fauna of New Zealand
Moths described in 1909
Taxa named by Edward Meyrick
Endemic moths of New Zealand